Carex baltzellii, Baltzell's sedge, is a species of flowering plant in the family Cyperaceae, native to the US states of Mississippi, Alabama, Florida, and Georgia. A rare species, it is found only on the slopes of forested ravines.

References

baltzellii
Endemic flora of the United States
Flora of Mississippi
Flora of Alabama
Flora of Florida
Flora of Georgia (U.S. state)
Plants described in 1847
Taxa named by Alvan Wentworth Chapman